Lütke is a German language surname. It stems from a reduced form of the male given name Ludolf – and may refer to:

August Lütke-Westhüs (1926–2000), German equestrian 
Manuela Lütke (born 1967), German footballer
Tobias Lütke (born 1981), Canadian billionaire

See also 
Ludecke
Lüdemann (disambiguation)

References 

German-language surnames
Surnames from given names